Jonas Jeppesen (born 3 January 1998) is a motorcycle speedway rider from Denmark.

Career
He rode in the top tier of British Speedway, riding for the Somerset Rebels in the SGB Premiership 2018. He was a finalist in the 2019 Individual Speedway Junior World Championship.

References 

1998 births
Living people
Danish speedway riders
Somerset Rebels riders